Birabenia is a genus of spiders in the family Lycosidae. It was first described in 1941 by Mello-Leitão. , it contains 2 species.

References

Lycosidae
Araneomorphae genera
Spiders of South America